Nordic combined at the 1964 Winter Olympics consisted of one event, held 2–3 February at Seefeld in Tirol.

Medal summary

Medal table

Events

Individual

Athletes did three normal hill ski jumps, with the lowest score dropped. They then raced a 15 kilometre cross-country course, with the time converted to points. The athlete with the highest combined points score was awarded the gold medal.

Participating NOCs

Eleven nations participated in Nordic combined at the Innsbruck Games.

References

External links
 Sports-Reference - 1964 Olympics - Nordic Combined - Individual

 
1964 Winter Olympics events
1964
1964 in Nordic combined
Nordic combined competitions in Austria
Men's events at the 1964 Winter Olympics